Beaver Municipal Airport  is a city-owned, public-use airport located one mile (2 km) southwest of the central business district of Beaver, a city in Beaver County, Oklahoma, United States.

Facilities and aircraft 
Runway 17/35 has an asphalt/gravel surface measuring 3,030 by 43 feet (924 x 13 m). Runway 4/22 has a turf surface measuring 3,025 by 95 feet (922 by 29 m).

For the 12-month period ending June 16, 2008, the airport had 1,000 general aviation aircraft operations, an average of 83 per month. At that time there were three aircraft based at this airport: three single-engine.

References

External links 

Airports in Oklahoma